Anaerococcus degeneri is a bacterium from the family Peptoniphilaceae.

References

Bacteria described in 2017
Peptoniphilaceae